Vinayak Sasikumar (born 13 June 1994) is an Indian lyricist, who works in Malayalam cinema.

Personal life
He was born in Trivandrum, Kerala to S. Sasikumar and Asha Sasikumar. At the age of 12, he started writing poetry. Later, he moved to Chennai and completed his graduation in Economics from Loyola College, Chennai. He completed his post-graduation from Madras School of Economics. After a span wherein he worked for Ford Motors as a data scientist, he moved to Kochi as a full-time lyricist.

Career
He made his debut as a lyricist in the movie Kutteem Kolum directed by Guinness Pakru. Later in the year 2013, he wrote songs for the movie Neelakasham Pachakadal Chuvanna Bhoomi directed by Sameer Thahir. The songs composed by Rex Vijayan, went on to become top hits. 
In 2013, he worked for the movie North 24 Kaatham, directed by Anil Radhakrishnan Menon.
In 2014, he wrote songs for the movie 7th Day, directed by Syamdhar. His next movie was Sapthamashree Thaskaraha. Vinayak wrote the themes of central characters in the Amal Neerad film Iyobinte Pusthakam later in 2014. However, his big break came in 2016 with the films Guppy and Karinkunnam 6's. The songs of Guppy were critically acclaimed and went on to become top hits. His major 2017 releases include Ezra(1 Song:irulu neelum), Godha, The Great Father, Parava, Pullikkaran Staraa and Mayaanadhi(2 Songs: Kaattil and Uyirin Nadiye).

Discography
List of Songs

Awards and recognitions 
 Best Lyricist 2019 - Mazhavil Music Awards
 Best Malayalam Lyricist 2018 - SIIMA (South Indian International Movie Awards)
 Best Malayalam Lyricist 2019 - SIIMA (South Indian International Movie Awards)
Best Lyricist of the Year 2019 - Asianet Film Awards

References

Living people
Malayalam-language lyricists
Screenwriters from Thiruvananthapuram
1994 births
20th-century Indian dramatists and playwrights